The Chery Eastar (or Oriental Sun/ 东方之子) is a mid-size car produced by the Chinese manufacturer Chery.

First Generation

The styling is controversial for heavily resembling the first generation Chevrolet Epica/ Daewoo Magnus sedan. A limousine version and parade car versions were also produced.   
The Eastar received a major facelift in 2012 and was also sold as the Chery Cowin 5 to be inline with the other Cowin sub-brand products.

Gallery

Second Generation

The Chery Eastar II (or Chery E8) is a mid-size car produced by the Chinese manufacturer Chery since 2012. A station wagon version was also available named the Chery Eastar Cross.

Engines

Gallery

References

External links

Chery UAE E8

E8
Mid-size cars
Sedans
Cars introduced in 2012
2010s cars
Cars of China